Paul Green may refer to:

Sports
 Paul Green (American football) (born 1966), American football player
 Paul Green (cricketer) (born 1976), former English cricketer
 Paul Green (footballer, born 1983), Irish footballer
 Paul Green (footballer, born 1987), English footballer
 Paul Green (rugby league) (1972–2022), Australian rugby league player and coach
 Paul Green (taekwondo) (born 1977), GB Taekwondo National Team coach and former Olympic taekwondo athlete

Others
 Paul Green (Australian politician) (born 1966), Mayor of Shoalhaven City Council and member of the Legislative Council of New South Wales
 Paul Green (engineer) (1924–2018), American electrical engineer
 Paul Green (musician) (born 1972), founder of the Paul Green School of Rock Music
 Paul Green (playwright) (1894–1981), American playwright
 Paul E. Green (1927–2012), American  marketing professor and statistician
 Paul W. Green (born 1952), Texas Supreme Court justice

See also
 Paul Greene (disambiguation)